Gandhar Bhatawadekar (born 8 July 1993) is an Indian cricketer. He made his first-class debut for Railways in the 2018–19 Ranji Trophy on 30 December 2018. He made his Twenty20 debut for Railways in the 2018–19 Syed Mushtaq Ali Trophy on 9 March 2019.

References

External links
 

1993 births
Living people
Indian cricketers
Railways cricketers
Place of birth missing (living people)